= Brophebarbital =

Chemical compound

Clinical data
- Other names: Brophebarbital
- ATC code: none

Legal status
- Legal status: CA: Schedule IV

Identifiers
- IUPAC name: 5-Ethyl-5-(3-bromophenyl)-1,3-diazinane-2,4,6-trione
- CAS Number: 3865-10-9
- ChemSpider: 27289066
- UNII: LAD0UT1E4E
- CompTox Dashboard (EPA): DTXSID50726647

Chemical and physical data
- Formula: C_{12}H_{11}BrN_{2}O_{3}
- Molar mass: 311.135 g·mol^{−1}
- 3D model (JSmol): Interactive image
- SMILES: Brc2cccc(c2)C1(CC)C(=O)NC(=O)NC1=O
- InChI: InChI=1S/C12H11BrN2O3/c1-2-12(7-4-3-5-8(13)6-7)9(16)14-11(18)15-10(12)17/h3-6H,2H2,1H3,(H2,14,15,16,17,18); Key:DFTKCGKSDZVCTO-UHFFFAOYSA-N

Brophebarbital is a barbiturate derivative. It has sedative and hypnotic effects and is considered to have a moderate abuse potential.
